Šimon Kupec (born 11 February 1996) is a Slovak football player who plays as a left back for FC Stadlau in Austria.

Club career

FK Dukla Banská Bystrica
He made his professional debut for Dukla Banská Bystrica against Košice on 12 July 2014.

References

External links
 
 FK Dukla Banská Bystrica profile
 Eurofotbal profile

1996 births
Living people
Slovak footballers
Slovak expatriate footballers
Association football defenders
FK Dukla Banská Bystrica players
FC ViOn Zlaté Moravce players
MFK Ružomberok players
GKS Katowice players
KFC Komárno players
FC Petržalka players
Slovak Super Liga players
2. Liga (Slovakia) players
I liga players
Sportspeople from Žiar nad Hronom
Expatriate footballers in Poland
Expatriate footballers in Austria
Slovak expatriate sportspeople in Poland
Slovak expatriate sportspeople in Austria